Wola Rasztowska transmitter was a mediumwave broadcasting facility at Wola Rasztowska near Warsaw in Poland at 21°17' E and 52°27' N. Wola Rasztowska transmitter, which was also known as Warszawa III was receivable until its shutdown on February 1, 1998, on 819 kHz in whole Europe. Wola Rasztowska transmitter went in service on July 22, 1953, and was between 1976 and 1988 an important facility for jamming the mediumwave transmitter of Radio Free Europe. The antenna of Wola Rasztowska transmitter consisted of 2 150 metres tall and 2 200 metres tall guyed masts.

After the shutdown of the facility, the masts were dismantled, but the transmitter building and its surrounding property are still there.

See also
 List of famous transmission sites
 List of tallest structures in Poland

External links
 https://web.archive.org/web/20061005123454/http://radiopolska.pl/portal/staticpages/index.php?page=wykaz-archiwum-am
 http://new.radiopolska.pl/forum/index.php?showtopic=7261
 http://www.forum.humantreeart.com/viewtopic.php?t=426&sid=9c9314c3219570f68ff6fa155cb17d22
 http://www.radiojamming.puslapiai.lt/article_pl.htm
 https://web.archive.org/web/20071201212852/http://www.wolnaeuropa.pl:80/z_historii-5.html

Communications in Poland
Buildings and structures in Masovian Voivodeship
Former radio masts and towers
Towers in Poland
Wołomin County
1953 establishments in Poland
Towers completed in 1953
1998 disestablishments in Poland